Simone Mazzola (born 22 April 1996 in Rome) is an Italian motorcycle racer. He currently races in the CIV Supersport 300 Championship aboard a Yamaha YZF-R3.

Mazzola suffered a crash during training for the Supersport 300 class race on the Italian championship at the Misano Circuit on 19 May 2017, resulting on severe spinal injuries. Condition was listed as "serious" as Mazzola recovered on a room besides Nicky Hayden.

Career statistics

Grand Prix motorcycle racing

By season

Races by year

References

External links

1996 births
Living people
Italian motorcycle racers
Moto3 World Championship riders